Mihail Vartolemei is a Romanian sprint canoer who competed in the late 1990s and early 2000s. He won six medals at the ICF Canoe Sprint World Championships with two gold (C-4 500 m: 2001, 2002), a silver (C-2 200 m: 2001), and three bronzes (C-2 200 m: 2002, C-4 200 m: 2002, C-4 1000 m: 2001).

References

Living people
Romanian male canoeists
Year of birth missing (living people)
ICF Canoe Sprint World Championships medalists in Canadian